Marucci is a surname. Notable people with the surname include:

Buddy Marucci (born 1952), American businessman and amateur golfer
Leone Marucci (born 1973), American filmmaker
Mat Marucci (born 1945), American jazz drummer, composer, author, educator, and clinician